Goibnenn mac Conaill (flourished 537) was the first king of the Ui Fiachrach Aidhne mentioned in the annals. He was the great-grandson of the high king Nath Í (died 445).

In 537 he defeated the King of Uisnech, Maine mac Cerbaill, of the Southern Ui Neill at the Battle of Claenloch (near Kinelea, Co. Galway) and Maine was slain. Maine was attempting to secure the hostages of the Uí Maine. This battle marked the division of the Ui Maine subject to Connacht and the Cenél Maine of Tethba, subject to the Southern Ui Neill. This victory would lead to the domination of the kingship of Connacht by the Ui Fiachrach Aidne in the 7th century.

Notes

References

 Annals of Ulster at CELT: Corpus of Electronic Texts at University College Cork
 Annals of Tigernach at CELT: Corpus of Electronic Texts at University College Cork
 Byrne, Francis John (2001), Irish Kings and High-Kings, Dublin: Four Courts Press, 
 Charles-Edwards, T. M. (2000), Early Christian Ireland, Cambridge: Cambridge University Press, 
Revised edition of McCarthy's synchronisms at Trinity College Dublin.

Kings of Connacht
People from County Galway
6th-century Irish monarchs